Soft Hands may refer to:

 Soft Hands (film), a 1964 Egyptian comedy film
 Soft Hands (album), a 2007 album by Ron McClure